Ommatlar (also Romanized as Amatlar and Ammatlar) is a village in Razan Rural District, in the Central District of Razan County, Hamadan Province, Iran. At the 2006 census, its population was 1,968, in 423 families.

References 

Populated places in Razan County